Nemanja Đekić (born 13 May 1997) is a Serbian football midfielder who plays for NK Zvijezda Gradačac.

Career
In mid January 2019, Đekić rejoined NK Zvijezda Gradačac.

References

External links
 
 Nemanja Đekić stats at utakmica.rs
 
 Player Profile at Srbijafudbal

1997 births
Living people
Sportspeople from Kragujevac
Association football midfielders
Serbian footballers
FK Jagodina players
FK Karađorđe Topola players
NK Zvijezda Gradačac players
FK Modriča players
Serbian SuperLiga players